Helen Walsh (born 1976) is an English novelist and film director. Her novels include Brass, which won a Betty Trask Award, and Once Upon a Time in England, which won a Somerset Maugham Award.

Personal life
Walsh was born in Warrington, Cheshire, in 1976. At the age of 16, she moved to Barcelona, Spain but returned to England in her early twenties.

Writing
Her first novel, Brass, was published in 2004 and won a Betty Trask Award. Her second novel, Once Upon a Time In England, was published in 2008 and won a 2009 Somerset Maugham Award and was shortlisted for the 2008 Portico Prize. Her third novel, Go to Sleep was published in 2011. All three were published by Canongate Press. 

Walsh's most recent novel, The Lemon Grove, was published in 2014 by Tinder Press. It concerns the illicit relationship between a woman and her stepdaughter's 17-year-old boyfriend on holiday in Mallorca.

Film
Walsh has also worked in the film industry. Her directorial debut The Violators was released in 2016.

References

External links
Official Helen Walsh website
British Council page
Canongate page for Helen Walsh
2009 interview

21st-century English novelists
People from Warrington
1977 births
Living people